Li Zuopeng (April 24, 1914 – January 3, 2009) was a general of the Chinese People's Liberation Army.

Biography
Li was born in Ji'an, Jiangxi in 1914. He joined the Chinese Red Army in 1930.

In the Cultural Revolution, Li was elected as the member of the 9th Politburo of the Communist Party of China in 1969. As an ally of Lin Biao, he lost his position after Lin Biao's fall. He was put on trial and given a seventeen-year prison sentence in 1981.

External links
Biography of Li Zuopeng, at Sina.com. 

1914 births
2009 deaths
People's Liberation Army generals from Jiangxi
Politicians from Ji'an
Chinese Communist Party politicians from Jiangxi
People's Republic of China politicians from Jiangxi
Members of the 9th Politburo of the Chinese Communist Party
People's Liberation Army generals convicted of crimes
Political commissars of the People's Liberation Army Navy